The Guinean weever (Trachinus armatus) is a fish of the family Trachinidae, widespread in the eastern Atlantic along the coasts of Africa from Mauritania to Angola. A marine, tropical, demersal fish, it grows up to  length.

References 

Guinean weaver
Fish of the East Atlantic
Marine fauna of West Africa
Fauna of Cape Verde
Guinean weaver